The Garmin Forerunner series is a selection of sports watches produced by Garmin. Most models use the Global Positioning System (GPS), and are targeted at road runners and triathletes. Forerunner series watches are designed to measure distance, speed, heart rate (optional), time, altitude, and pace.

Models 
The Forerunner series consists of the 101, 201, 301, 205, 305, 50, 405, 60, 405CX, 310XT, 110, 210, 410, 610, 910XT, 70, 10, 220, 620, 15, 920XT, 225, 25, 230, 235, 630, 735XT, 35, 935, 30, 645, 645 Music, 45, 45S, 245, 245 Music, 945, 745, 55, 945 LTE, 255, 255 Music, 955, 955 Solar (listed in chronological order by release date). All models except the 101 include a way to upload training data to a personal computer and training software.

Garmin registered the name "Forerunner" with the United States Patent and Trademark Office in August 2001 but released the first watches—the 101, 201, and 301—in 2003.

In 2006, the improved 205 and 305 appeared. These models are smaller than the first generation and feature a more sensitive SiRFstarIII GPS receiver chip.

In late 2007, the Forerunner 50 was introduced. As opposed to GPS, this model paired with a foot pod to measure displacement. The Forerunner 50 also came packaged with a USB stick that allowed training data to be transferred wirelessly to one's pc. This feature has since become a staple of Garmin's more full-featured sport watches.

The Forerunner 405 was introduced in 2008 and is significantly smaller than its predecessors, only slightly outsizing a typical wristwatch. The 405 also featured improved satellite discovery and connection.

In 2009, Garmin produced three new models: the Forerunner 60 (an evolution of the Forerunner 50), the Forerunner 405CX (405 chassis), and the Forerunner 310XT (an evolution of the 305 chassis). New features included additional battery life and vibration alerts on the 310XT and advanced calorie consumption modelling on all watches. The new calorie consumption modelling in these devices was the result of Garmin's first collaboration with Finnish physiological analytics firm First beat. The 310XT was also the first watch of the Forerunner series to be waterproof, thus allowing its use for swimming and on all legs of a Triathlon, also thanks to extended battery life. In 2010 a firmware update added vastly improved open-water swimming metrics.

In 2010, the Forerunner 110, 210 and 410 were introduced. The releases included the addition of a touch-sensitive bezel on the 410, presumably, although heavily debated, allowing for easier scrolling and selection of functions. It was touted as providing "unmatched reliability in sweaty, rainy conditions."

The Forerunner 610 was released in the spring of 2011. It features a touch-sensitive screen as well as vibration alerts.

In 2012 the Forerunner 910XT was introduced, which is a development of the 310XT. This version was originally supposed to be released in Q4 of 2011, but the November date had slipped and it was eventually released in Q1 of 2012. New features are the inclusion of the Sifter iv chipset, a barometric altimeter, and improved swimming metrics using an accelerometer in the watch. This allowed it to automatically count pool lengths and to recognize swimming styles.

A further addition to the series was the Forerunner 10, a simple watch offering just GPS tracking of activities and run metrics like distance, pace and calories burned.

At the end of 2013 the Forerunner 220 and 620 were introduced, with colour screens, Bluetooth Low Energy (BTLE; allowing connections to some smartphones), and, for the 620 only, a touchscreen, Wi-Fi (allowing automatic activity download) and enhanced "running dynamics" given by an updated Heart rate monitor. These watches also abandon syncing via the ANT+ protocol in favour of wired (USB) and Wi-Fi (620 only) data transfers. They are also fully waterproof, but do not include any kind of swimming mode.

In 2014, the Forerunner 15 and 920XT were introduced. The 15 is a development of the 10, adding activity tracking, increased battery life, footpad and heart rate monitor capability. The 920XT is the successor of the 910XT, featuring all the capabilities of it (except ANT+ scale and fitness equipment capability) and adding features found in the 620 such as a colour screen, Wi-Fi data transfers and running dynamics. Additionally, battery life over the 910XT was improved, daily activity tracking, GLONASS support and a swim drill mode added, and the 920XT is the first Garmin watch extensible with custom apps built using the Garmin Connect IQ software development kit.

Announced in May 2015, the Forerunner 225 is the first Garmin watch with an integrated optical heart rate monitor.

Announced in May 2016, the Forerunner 735XT is a triathlon-ready Garmin watch with an integrated optical heart rate monitor.

In April 2017, Garmin announced the Forerunner 935, billing it as a watch for running and triathlons with features similar to the Fenix 5. The watch boasts 24/7 wrist-based heart rate monitoring and new advanced training features.

On March 12, 2018, Garmin released the Forerunner 645 and 645 Music marketed as a high-end running watch. The watch adds Garmin Pay, an NFC-enabled touchless pay system and the 645 Music is Garmin's first watch with onboard music storage (4 GB).

The Forerunner 45/45S, released on April 30, 2019, is an entry-level running watch. The 45S has a smaller bezel (39mm) than the 45 (42mm) - there are no other differences.  It has a 3rd generation optical heart rate monitor which features stress detection and Body Battery™ energy, along with earlier-generation OHR metrics. Bluetooth-connected features include audio prompts, Live Track, and smart notifications. The activity profiles include outdoor running, treadmill, walk, bike, and cardio, with the ability to configure more through Garmin Connect. The Forerunner 45 also has built-in incident detection and assistance, which notifies a predetermined contact if you crash or fall and provides a live track link of your location.

The Forerunner 245/245 Music, released on April 30, 2019, are mid-range running watches. The 245 has all of the same capabilities as the 245 Music, though the 245 Music allows you to store and play up to 500 songs directly on the watch or play music through music streaming services, such as Spotify or Deezer, through wireless Bluetooth earphones. The 245 has Garmin Elevate with a 3rd generation optical heart rate monitor which features Pulse Ox, stress detection, Body Battery™ energy, along with earlier-generation OHR metrics. Also new for the Forerunner is a detailed Activity summary screen, improved Race Predictor and Training Status.

The Forerunner 945, released on April 30, 2019, is a triathlon-focused feature-rich watch. The 945 allows you to store and play up to 1000 song directly on the watch or play music through music streaming services, such as Spotify or Deezer, through wireless Bluetooth earphones. The 945 has all of the capabilities of its 935 predecessor and all of the features of the Forerunner 245.  Other new features of the 945 are heat and altitude acclimation, training load balance, mapping with Trendline™ popularity routing, respiration rate, Around me mode, Climber™ future elevation plot, cartography support and topographical maps, XERO™ location, and for the golfer, the 945 is preloaded with 41,000 courses.

The Forerunner 955, released April 31, 2022, is a superset of the Forerunner 945 and includes a touch screen. To extend battery life, the Forerunner 955 has a solar charging ring in the display. Charging for both 955 models is through the proprietary Garmin charging port and a USB-A connector.

Features

GPS functionality
The Forerunner can be used to record historical data by completing a workout and then uploading the data to a computer to create a log of previous exercise activities for analysis.

Additionally, the Forerunner can be used to navigate during a workout. Users can "mark" their current location and then edit this entry's name and coordinates, which enables navigation to those new coordinates. The watch uses the hh.mm.mm (hours, minutes, and minute decimals) coordinate format. The 310XT can display additional formats; it also has a screen to display current coordinates in real-time.

Computer interface
The user can download a previously-travelled course/route to the Forerunner using Garmin's Communicator software together with the ANT+ technology, and then follow this course/route to "race" against this historical course/route. Until recently this download was possible via the tethered USB connection on the older 205 & 305 models. However, the current version of the software has eliminated this option, requiring the user to acquire a newer model with a wireless connection in order to use this feature.

The user can also make new courses or routes, which can be downloaded to the watch and then followed. This is a convenient way to go on a cross-country bike ride while navigating with the Forerunner. Note: navigating with a course is better than navigating with a route, because a Garmin course can store more points than a Garmin route.

Additionally, a user can create downloadable points of interest (POIs) by creating a custom map with Google Maps.  POIs can be transferred to the 205 or 305 but not to the 405 or 310XT.

Release history

Timeline

More details: List of Garmin products#Launch dates 2

Feature comparison

Key: Current Model

See also
Garmin Fenix
List of Garmin products

References

External links 
Garmin Official Site

Sport of athletics equipment
Garmin
Global Positioning System